Beijing Beida Jade Bird Universal Sci-Tech Co., Ltd. known as Jade Bird Universal is a Chinese listed company. It manufactured electronic fire equipment, as well involved in tourism industry and other equity investments. The largest shareholder of Jade Bird Universal is the non-wholly-owned subsidiaries of Peking University.

Jade Bird Universal was a former constituent of Hang Seng China Enterprises Index from 10 August 2000 to 3 October 2001.

Name
Beida Jade Bird Universal Sci-Tech, known as Jade Bird Universal once had an intermediate parent company "Beijing Beida Yuhuan Microelectronic System Engineering". Yuhuan and Huanyu literally a word play of the Chinese word Universal. Like other sister companies, they all bear the brand "Beida Jade Bird", "Jade Bird", "PKU Jade Bird" or "Peking University Jade Bird"

History
Beijing Beida Jade Bird Universal Sci-Tech Co., Ltd. was incorporated on 29 March 2000. In the same year the company was registered in Hong Kong as a foreign company. Before initial public offering, the share capital (70 million number of shares of  each) were owned by a subsidiary of Heng Huat Investments (employee ownership of Jade Bird Software) for 31.43% shares, Jade Bird Software subsidiaries (Beijing Jade Bird, Jade Bird Software System, Beida Yuhuan Microelectronic System Engineering) for 33.57% shares, Beijing Tianqiao Beida Beida Jade Bird Sci-Tech, an associate company of Jade Bird Software for 10.71%, Mongolia Energy Corporation (formerly known as New World Cyberbase) for 10.00%, a private equity fund AR Asia Special Strategies Fund for 7.14%, as well as private investors Dragon Air Investments (NOT related to Dragonair) and Hinet (NOT related to Chunghwa Telecom) for 4.29% and 2.86% respectively. The IPO issued at first 24 million H shares for HK$11 each.

As at 31 December 2015 the H shares had expanded to 484.8 million with  each in par value.

Subsidiaries

 Beida Jade Bird Universal Sci-Tech (Cayman) Development (100%)
 Beida Jade Bird Universal Fire Alarm Device (51%)
 Beijing Jade Bird Universal Fire System Software Service (51%)
 Chuanqi Tourism Investment (60%)
 Hengsheng Investment Management (55%)
 Si Chuan Jiu Yuan Intelligent Surveillance (38%)
 PWC Winery (75%)

Shareholders
An additional 7.17% shares were held by Shenzhen Beida Jade Bird Sei-Tech, a subsidiary (90%) of Beijing Beida Jade Bird; an additional 7.17% shares were held by another indirect subsidiary (46%) of Jade Bird Software: Haikou Jade Bird Yuanwang Sci-Tech Development; the shares held by "Jade Bird Shenzhen" would be transferred to "Jade Bird Haikou".

The second largest shareholder was Heng Huat Investments for 17.34% shares (a company for employee-ownership); it was followed by "Grand East (H.K.)" for 9.28%, Mongolia Energy Corporation for 7.14% and AR Asia Special Strategies Fund (via subsidiary Asian Technology Investment) for 4.22%.

References

External links
  

Companies listed on the Hong Kong Stock Exchange
Manufacturing companies of China
Software companies of China
Tourism in China
Peking University
Employee-owned companies of China
Government-owned companies of China
Chinese companies established in 2000
Conglomerate companies of China
Privatization in China
H shares
Companies formerly in the Hang Seng China Enterprises Index